Timiskaming—Cochrane was a federal electoral district in Ontario that was represented in the House of Commons of Canada from 1997 to 2003. It was located in the northeast part of Ontario. This riding was created in 1996 from parts of Cochrane—Superior, Nipissing, Timiskaming—French River and Timmins—Chapleau ridings.

Timiskaming—Cochrane consisted of the Territorial District of Timiskaming excluding a portion including and to the west of the townships of Douglas and Geikie; the southeast part of the Territorial District of Cochrane; the eastern part of the Territorial District of Sudbury; and the northwest part of the Territorial District of Nipissing.

The electoral district was abolished in 2003 when it was redistributed between Nickel Belt, Nipissing—Timiskaming and Timmins—James Bay ridings.

Members of Parliament

This riding has elected the following Members of Parliament:

Electoral history

|- 
  
|Liberal
|Benoît Serré
|align="right"| 20,580 
  
|Progressive Conservative
|John Hodgson
|align="right"| 4,886 
 
|New Democratic
|Marie-Jeanne Lacroix  
|align="right"|4,623 

|}

|- 
  
|Liberal
|Benoît Serré
|align="right"|19,403 

  
|Progressive Conservative
| William J. Stairs
|align="right"| 2,603 
 
|New Democratic
|Ambrose Raftis
|align="right"| 2,461

|}

See also 

 List of Canadian federal electoral districts
 Past Canadian electoral districts

External links 

 Website of the Parliament of Canada

Former federal electoral districts of Ontario